The Borgo Giuseppino is a neighbourhood of Trieste, Italy, planned and built starting from the end of the 18th century. The name comes from the Emperor of Austria Joseph II, Holy Roman Emperor, son of the empress Maria Theresa of Austria.

Neighbourhoods in Italy
Geography of Trieste